Budibud is one of the Kilivila languages (of the Austronesian language family), spoken on the tiny Lachlan Islands, east of Woodlark Island in Papua New Guinea.

References

Papuan Tip languages
Languages of Milne Bay Province
Vulnerable languages
Woodlark Islands